Cumbrian was launched at Shields in 1811. Initially, during the last years of the Napoleonic Wars, Cumbrian was a transport. After the end of the war she became a West Indiaman. In 1817 she made one voyage to Bengal, sailing under a licence from the British East India Company (EIC). In 1819 she became a whaler, sailing from Kingston upon Hull to the northern whale fishery (Greenland (Gr) and Davis Strait (DS)). From 1835 on she left whaling and started trading more widely, to North America, Bombay, and Africa. She was driven ashore in August 1844, refloated, and subsequently condemned.

Career
Cumbrian first appeared in the Register of Shipping (RS) in 1811.

Cumbrian, Smith, master, was reported to have arrived at Jamaica on 2 May 1816. She was back at Deal on 13 February 1817, and Gravesend two days later.

In 1813 the EIC had lost its monopoly on the trade between India and Britain. British ships were then free to sail to India or the Indian Ocean under a license from the EIC.

In 1817 Cumbrian, J.Brodie, master, sailed to Fort William, India under a licence from the EIC. She sailed from Deal on 29 May 1817, bound for Bengal. On 8 July she stopped at Tenerife and the next day resumed her voyage. Prior to 12 June 1818 she was at the Cape of Good Hope, having come from Bengal. She was off Dover on 3 September. 

Cumbrian first appeared in Lloyd's Register (LR) in 1818.

From 1819 to 1835 Cumbrian sailed from Hull as a whaler, hunting whales at Greenland or Davis Strait. The data in the table below is from Coltish.

On 26 June 1822, ice crushed ; all the crew survived. Captain William Manger, of Lady Forbes transferred to Cumbrian. On the following Sunday, Captain Johnson asked Manger to raise the Bethel Flag and conduct a prayer service for the seamen from all the nearby whalers.

Cumbrian ceased whaling in 1835. In her some 17 years in the trade she had averaged about 10 fish a year, for a total take of a little more than 170 whales.

On 12 January 1843 Cumbrian sailed for Madras and Bengal. She put back four days later with the loss of her sails and quarter-boat, and with one man having been washed overboard. On 22 September she sailed from Calcutta for London.

Fate
Cumbrian was driven ashore on 28 August 1844. She was refloated seventeen day later and resumed her voyage to Sierra Leone. She arrived on 2 October and was condemned. LR for 1844 carried the annotation "Condemned" by her name.

Notes

Citations

References
 
 
  Re Brunswick (1814S)

1811 ships
Ships built on the River Tyne
Age of Sail merchant ships of England
Ships of the British East India Company
Whaling ships
Maritime incidents in August 1844